The 2016 Judo Grand Slam was held in Abu Dhabi, United Arab Emirates, from 28 to 30 October 2016.

Medal summary

Men's events

Women's events

Source Results

Medal table

References

External links
 

2016 IJF World Tour
2016 Judo Grand Slam
Judo
Grand Slam Abu Dhabi 2016
Judo
Judo